The Greenfield Festival is an annual rock music festival held on the outskirts of the town of Interlaken, in the Swiss canton of Bern.

Editions

2005 

 Date: 24–26 June 2005
 Visitors: 25,500

Line-up: 
 Adam Green
 Aereogramme
 Alter Bridge
 Boss Martians
 Breed 77
 Bright Eyes
 Burrell
 Clawfinger
 De-Phazz
 Die Toten Hosen
 Donots
 Eagles of Death Metal
 The Eighties Matchbox B-Line Disaster
 Element of Crime
 Fantômas
 Favez
 Feeder
 Finch
 Flogging Molly
 Giant Sand
 Goldenhorse
 Grannysmith
 Green Day
 Jimmy Eat World
 Kettcar
 La Vela Puerca
 Madrugada
 Madsen
 Melody Club
 Millencolin
 Moondog Show
 Nguru (short term for the failed Mars Volta)
 Pennywise
 Shilf
 Simple Plan
 Slut
 Snitch
 System of a Down
 The (International) Noise Conspiracy
 The Faint
 The Hellacopters
 Turbonegro

The performances by Nine Inch Nails and Queens of the Stone Age had to be canceled because of bad weather.

2006 

 Date: 16. – 18. June 2006
 Visitors: 20'000

Line-up: 
 A.F.
 Amplifier
 Apocalyptica
 Archie Bronson Outfit
 Archive
 Art Brut
 Babyshambles (canceled)
 Backyard Babies
 Billy Talent
 Depeche Mode
 dEUS
 Donots
 Elbow
 Hard-Fi
 In Extremo
 Karamelo Santo
 Kashmir
 Lagwagon
 Live
 Mad Caddies
 Maxïmo Park
 Nguru
 Pale
 Panteón Rococó
 Placebo
 Redwood
 Seeed
 Speck
 Starsailor
 The Answer
 The Cardigans
 The Datsuns
 The Delilahs
 The Peacocks
 The Sisters of Mercy
 The Soundtrack of Our Lives
 The Weepies
 Therapy?
 Tool
 Trivium
 System of a Down
 William White & The Emergency

2007 

 Date: 15. – 17. June 2007
 Visitors: 24'848

Line-up:
 Thirty Seconds to Mars
 Cataract
 Die Happy
 dredg
 Five O’Clock Heroes
 Flogging Molly
 Frank Black
 Hayseed Dixie
 Head Automatica
 Hinder (canceled)
 Houston Swing Engine
 Ill Niño
 Incubus
 Itchy Poopzkid
 Juliette and the Licks
 La Vela Puerca
 Less Than Jake
 Madsen
 Manic Street Preachers
 Marilyn Manson
 McQueen
 Me First and the Gimme Gimmes
 My Chemical Romance (canceled)
 Navel
 Porcupine Tree
 Queens of the Stone Age
 Reel Big Fish
 Slayer
 Snitch
 Sonic Youth
 Stone Sour
 Sugarplum Fairy
 The 69 Eyes
 The Films
 The Hives
 The Killers
 The Lemonheads
 The Smashing Pumpkins
 Therapy?
 Tomte

2008 

 Date: 13. – 15. June 2008
 Visitors: 26'218

Line-up:
 3 Doors Down (canceled, substitute: Heaven Shall Burn)
 Apocalyptica
 Bad Religion (as a replacement for Linkin Park)
 Beatsteaks
 Black Rebel Motorcycle Club
 Blackmail
 Bullet for My Valentine
 Coheed and Cambria
 Die Ärzte
 Donots
 Enter Shikari
 Funeral for a Friend (canceled)
 Heaven Shall Burn
 In Extremo
 In Flames
 Jaguar Love
 Kettcar
 Kilians
 Linkin Park (due to illness of guitarist short canceled)
 Millencolin
 NOFX
 Oceansize
 Panteón Rococó
 Reign of Silence
 Rise Against
 Schwellheim
 Sick of It All
 Slut
 The Bianca Story
 The Blackout
 The Donnas
 The Offspring
 The Weakerthans
 Zebrahead
 Zox

2009 

 Date: 12. – 14. June 2009
 Visitors: n/a

Line-up:
 A Day to Remember
 ...And You Will Know Us by the Trail of Dead
 Animal Kingdom
 August Burns Red
 Billy Talent
 Broilers
 Caliban
 Cataract
 Disturbed
 Dredg
 Dryconditions
 Faith No More
 Flogging Molly
 Future of the Left
 Gallows
 Gogol Bordello
 Guano Apes
 Horse the Band
 Itchy Poopzkid
 Karamelo Santo
 Korn
 Less Than Jake
 Lovedrug
 Monster Magnet
 Neimo (as a replacement for Face to Face)
 Nightwish
 Parkway Drive
 Shinedown
 Slipknot
 Social Distortion
 Soulfly
 Staind
 Tomte
 Trivium
 The Blackbox Revelation
 The Krupa Case
 The Subways
 The Temper Trap
 The Ting Tings
 The Wombats
 Volbeat

2010

 Date : 11. - 13. June 2010

Line-Up: 
 Beatsteaks
 Bleeding Through
 Blessed by a Broken Heart
 Callejon
 Coheed and Cambria
 Crime in Stereo
 Danko Jones
 Donots
 Eluveitie
 General Fiasco
 Goodbye Fairbanks
 Grannysmith
 Hatebreed
 Heaven Shall Burn
 HIM
 Hot Water Music
 Juliette Lewis
 LoveHateHero
 Mad Sin
 Neaera
 Panteón Rococó
 Porcupine Tree
 Rammstein
 Subway to Sally
 The Beauty of Gemina
 The Dillinger Escape Plan
 The Hives
 The Peacocks
 The Prodigy
 The Used
 Turbostaat
 Unheilig
 WIZO

2011

 Date : 09. - 11. June 2011

Line-Up: 
 Adept
 After the Burial
 All Time Low
 Anti-Flag
 Apocalyptica
 BoySetsFire
 Broilers
 Bullet for My Valentine
 Caliban
 Callejon (as a replacement for Alesana)
 Comeback Kid
 Converge
 Dredg
 Escapado
 Favez
 Framing Hanley
 Frank Turner
 Flogging Molly
 Foo Fighters
 Fuckup
 Itchy Poopzkid
 Kvelertak
 Lacuna Coil
 Long Distance Calling
 Madsen
 Navel
 Parkway Drive
 Sick of It All
 Silverstein
 Social Distortion
 Sublime with Rome
 Suicide Silence
 System of a Down
 The Dreadnoughts
 The Gaslight Anthem
 The Ocean
 The Rambling Wheels
 The Sorrow (as a replacement for All Shall Perish)
 The Young Gods
 Volbeat
 We Butter the Bread with Butter
 Wolfmother
 Young Guns

2012

 Date : 15. - 17. June 2012

Line-Up: 

 Die Ärzte
 Limp Bizkit
 The Offspring
 Rise Against
 Billy Talent
 In Flames
 The Hives
 Skindred
 Refused
 In Extremo
 Heaven Shall Burn
 Sepultura
 Eluveitie
 Hatebreed
 Lagwagon
 Schandmaul
 Fear Factory
 Enter Shikari
 Pennywise
 Mad Caddies
 Hot Water Music
 Zebrahead
 Less Than Jake
 Black Veil Brides
 H-Blockx
 La Vela Puerca
 Donots
 Street Dogs
 All Shall Perish
 Neaera
 The Bronx
 Darkest Hour
 The Beauty of Gemina
 Emmure
 Bury Tomorrow
 La Dispute
 Talco
 Wolves Like Us
 While She Sleeps
 Turbowolf
 Death by Chocolate
 Hathors
 Delilahs
 Breakdown of Sanity
 Make Me a Donut (Facebook-contest winner)
 End (Bscene-contest winner)
 Fathead (Restorm-contest winner)

External links 
 www.greenfieldfestival.ch (Official Website)
 www.fkpscorpio.com (Official website of the organizer, deutsch)

Interlaken
Heavy metal festivals in Switzerland
Rock festivals in Switzerland
Punk rock festivals
Summer events in Switzerland